Simplimorpha lanceifoliella is a moth of the family Nepticulidae first described by Vari in 1955. It is found in southern Africa.

There are several generations per year.

The larvae feed on Anacardiaceae species, including Rhus lancea. They mine the leaves of their host plant. The mine consists of a linear gallery. Pupation takes place in a cocoon in the soil.

External links
Nieukerken, Erik J. van (1986). "Systematics and Phylogeny of Holarctic Genera of Nepticulidae (Lepidoptera, Heteroneura: Monotrysia)". Zoologische Verhandelingen. (236) – via Internet Archive.

Nepticulidae
Moths of Africa
Moths described in 1955